The 1972–73 European Cup was the eighth edition of the European Cup, IIHF's premier European club ice hockey tournament. The season started on October, 1972 and finished on August 20, 1974.

The tournament was won by CSKA Moscow, who beat Brynäs IF in the final

First round

 Dukla Jihlava,    
 Ilves  :  bye

Second round

Third round

Brynäs IF ,    
 CSKA Moscow  :  bye

Semifinals

Final

References
 Season 1973

1
IIHF European Cup